Hazaribagh Stadium is a multi-purposed stadium in Hazaribagh, Jharkhand. The stadium has hosted two Ranji Trophy matches for Bihar cricket team in 1987 against Tripura cricket team as match was won by Bihar cricket team by an innings and 144 runs.  Second was  played in 1988 between Bihar cricket team and Orissa cricket team as the match ended in a drawn.

References

External links 
 Cricketarchive
 Cricinfo
 Wikimapia

Hazaribagh
Multi-purpose stadiums in India
Sports venues in Jharkhand
Cricket grounds in Jharkhand
Sports venues completed in 1988
1988 establishments in Bihar
20th-century architecture in India